Luxor International Airport  is the main airport serving the city of Luxor, Egypt. It is located 6 km (4 miles) east of the city. Many charter airlines use the airport, as it is a popular tourist destination for those visiting the River Nile and the Valley of the Kings.

Facilities
In 2005, the airport was upgraded to accommodate up to 8 million passengers a year. Facilities for passengers include 48 check-in desks, 8 gates, 5 baggage claim belts, a post office, a bank, a Bureau de change, an auto exchange machine (CIB), restaurants, cafeterias, a VIP Lounge, a duty-free shop, a newsagent/tobacconist, a chemist shop, a gift shop, a travel agency, a tourist help desk, car rental, first aid, a baby/parent Room, disabled access/facilities and a business centre.

Facilities for cargo include refrigerated storage, animal quarantine, livestock handling, health officials, X-Ray equipment, and fumigation equipment. The cargo terminal handling agent for the airport is EgyptAir Cargo.

Airlines and destinations
The following airlines operate regular scheduled and charter flights at Luxor Airport:

Accidents and incidents
 On 21 September 1987, an EgyptAir Airbus A300 crashed on landing during a training flight, killing all five crew members on board.
On 6 April 1994, a Sudan Airways Boeing 737-200 was hijacked and diverted to Luxor. Upon landing, the hijacker surrendered to the authorities. There were no fatalities or injuries and the aircraft was not damaged. 
On 20 February 2009, an Antonov An-12 crashed after an engine caught fire on take-off. All five crew were killed.

See also 
List of airports in Egypt

References

External links

Airports in Egypt
Luxor